The  is a musical instrument from the Sundanese people in Indonesia made of a varying number of bamboo tubes attached to a bamboo frame. The tubes are carved to have a resonant pitch when struck and are tuned to octaves, similar to Western handbells. The base of the frame is held in one hand, while the other hand shakes the instrument, causing a repeating note to sound. Each performer in an  ensemble is typically responsible for just one pitch, sounding their individual  at the appropriate times to produce complete melodies (see Kotekan).

The  is popular throughout the world, but it originated in what is now West Java and Banten provinces in Indonesia, and has been played by the Sundanese for many centuries. The  and its music have become an important part of the cultural identity of Sundanese communities.

Etymology 
The word  may have originated from Sundanese , suggesting the movement of the  player and the onomatopoeic  sound that comes from the instrument.

History 
According to Dr. Groneman, the  had already been a favorite musical instrument of the entire archipelago even before the Hindu era. According to Jaap Kunst in Music in Java, besides West Java,  also exists in South Sumatra and Kalimantan. Lampung, East Java and Central Java are also familiar with the instrument.

In the Hindu period and the time of the Kingdom of Sunda, the instrument played an important role in ceremonies. The  was played to honor Dewi Sri, the goddess of fertility, so she would bless their land and lives.  The  also signaled the time for prayers, and was said to have been played since the 7th century in the Kingdom of Sunda. In the Kingdom of Sunda, it provided martial music during the Battle of Bubat, as told in the Kidung Sunda.
Other antique  are stored in the Sri Baduga Museum, Bandung. The oldest  tradition is called  ("ancient ") from Lebak Regency, Banten. The  is an ancient type of  played by Baduy people of the inland Banten province during the seren taun harvest ceremony.

In 1938, Daeng Soetigna (Sutigna), from Bandung, created an  that is based on the diatonic scale instead of the traditional pélog or sléndro scales. Since then, the  has returned to popularity and is used for education and entertainment, and may even accompany Western instruments in an orchestra. In 1966 Udjo Ngalagena, a student of Daeng Soetigna, opened his  ("House of Angklung") as a centre for its preservation and development.

UNESCO designated the  a Masterpiece of the Oral and Intangible Heritage of Humanity on November 18, 2010.

Varieties

Traditional

This  is used to accompany the ritual of planting rice on the fields passed down by their ancestors.  are only made by the Baduy Dalam tribe who still maintain the pure traditions of their ancestors.

is an  that originates from the Dogdog Lojor culture found in the Kasepuhan Pancer Pangawinan community or Kesatuan Banten Kidul scattered around Mount Halimun.  is used to accompany the tradition of farming, circumcision, and marriage.

is an  originating from Cipinang village, Cigudeg, Bogor, West Java. According to legend,  began to exist when Cipining village experienced a dry season because Dewi Sri did not make it rain.

is an  originating from Garut, West Java. Initially, this  was used for the ritual of planting rice, but now it has shifted to be used to accompany the preaching of Islam. It takes nine  to complete the  accompaniment process consisting of two , one , four , two , two , and two .

is an  that originates in Bungko village, Cirebon, West Java.  is played with other musical instruments such as kendang,  and gongs. In ancient times,  was a musical accompaniment to fights between villagers. The existing  consists of three pieces which are believed to be 600 years old. This old  is believed to have originated from Ki Gede Bungko, the elder of Bungko village, as well as the Commander of the Navy of the Cirebon Sultanate in the Sunan Gunung Jati era around the 15th century. This  cannot be played anymore because it is fragile. The people believe that  has magical powers.

is a type of  that is used for performing arts at parades or carnivals. Under the care of the Kanca Indihiang Big Family,  in its era around the 70s can be known everywhere. Before the invention of local anesthetics, a child who was going to be circumcised early in the morning would be paraded to the pool to soak in it.  would be played on the way to and from the pool as the people watched, similar to a parade.

Initially,  was used in agricultural events related to rice. Nowadays,  is used as entertainment. This is related to societal changes and less emphasis on traditional beliefs. In addition, rice storage barns began to disappear from people's homes, replaced by sack places that were more practical and easy to carry. Many of the rice is now sold directly, not stored in barns.

This musical instrument is a traditional Sundanese musical instrument, which is also known and developed in the Banyumas region. Initially,  was performed to accompany Sundanese traditional ceremonies as a ritual for the celebration of the people of West Java, but with the development of the  era, it began to be used as a musical instrument for entertainment.

Angklung Reog is a musical instrument to accompany the Reog Ponorogo Dance in East Java. Angklung Reog has a characteristic in terms of a very loud sound, has two tones and an attractive curved shape of rattan (unlike the usual angklung in the form of a cube) decorated with beautiful colored fringed threads.
It is said that angklung was a weapon from the kingdom of Bantarangin against the kingdom of Lodaya in the 11th century, when the victory by the kingdom of Bantarangin was happy, the soldiers were no exception, the angklung holder was no exception, because of the extraordinary strength of the reinforcement of the rope, it loosened to produce a distinctive sound, namely klong-klok. and klung-kluk when heard will feel spiritual vibrations.

Is a type of Angklung Reog from Sambit, Ponorogo. Shaped like Angklung Reyog but arranged from small to the largest angklung with various tones, Gong Gumbeng Angklung is the first and oldest type of pitched angklung. A set of angklung Gong Gumbeng that is more than 250 years old is now stored in the Sri Baduga Bandung Museum.

Balinese angklung called Rindik has a distinctive Balinese shape and tone. The angklung Rindik is played by hitting the bamboo like a gamelan. Rindik Bali was originally Angklung Reog from Ponorogo who was brought by later Majapahit officials.

Modern  or 

In 1938, Daeng Soetigna made an innovation so that the  could play diatonic notes. The tuning used is diatonic, according to the western music system, and can even be presented in an orchestral form.

A melody  specifically consists of two sound tubes with a pitch difference of one octave. In one  unit, generally there are 31 small melodic  and 11 large melodic . The voice tube consists of three to four, according to a diatonic chord. After Daeng Soetigna's innovation, other reforms continued to develop. After Daeng Soetigna, one of his students, Udjo Ngalagena, continued his efforts by establishing  in the Bandung area.

is a term for  that only uses round tones (without chromatic tones) with a basic tone of C. The small unit of  contains 8 angklung (Low to High Do tones), while  plus contains 13 angklung (Low to High Sol until High mi).

is a musical ensemble of various musical instruments made of bamboo.  was born around the 1960s in West Java, Indonesia, and is now a typical West Javanese musical instrument. In 1964, Yoes Roesadi and his friends formed a musical group that specifically added angklung to its ensemble line. They got the idea to call themselves the Arumba group (Alunan Rumpun Bambu – Strains of Bamboo). With the passage of time, the term arumba finally stuck as an ensemble of bamboo music from West Java.
 is a term for a set of musical instruments consisting of at least:
) Angklung – One unit of melody angklung, hung so that it can be played by one person
) Lodong (big bamboo) – One lodong bass unit, also lined up so that it can be played by one person
) Gambang I – Melody bamboo xylophone
) Gambang II – Companion bamboo xylophone
) Kendang – Traditional drum

is a new innovation from conventional angklung which was already legendary. The difference between Angklung toel and the angklung that people have known so far lies in its placement. This angklung has a waist-high frame with several angklungs lined up upside down and given a rubber band. How to play it is quite unique, almost similar to playing the piano. People who want to play  simply 'touch' (toel) the angklung according to the tone and the angklung will vibrate for a while because of the rubber.

Angklung toel was created by Kang Yayan Udjo from Saung Angklung Udjo in 2008. With this Angklung toel, giving a new color to the world of angklung, this type of angklung makes playing it easier and simpler.

was created from the idea of Eko Mursito Budi for the purposes of angklung robots. One angklung uses two or more sound tubes with the same tone, so that it will produce a pure tone (mono-tonal). This is different from the multi-tonal in angklung Padaeng. With this simple idea, the robot can easily play a combination of several angklungs simultaneously to imitate the effects of melodic angklung and accompaniment angklung.

Notations

Sundanese Daminatila 
It's a kind of numbered musical notation like the solfège, but it uses a different system: high numbers correspond to low tones, and vice versa. This system might seem to be counterintuitive to people who are already familiar with the western solfège. There are only 5 notes used in each scales: 1, 2, 3, 4, and 5, read as da, mi, na, ti, and la. The absolute tones depend on the scale used and the base frequency, which don't adhere to western standards. Traditional angklung have some common scales: saléndro, degung/pélog, and sorog/madenda.

Diatonic
Diatonic notation for angklung use a numbered musical notation in Indonesia, similar notation like Jianpu, but with some different standards, like the placement of rhythm lines positions and chord notations. The musical notation is written based on movable do. The musical notation displays 1 as relative do, 2 as relative re, etc. Higher octave marked with a dot above, and lower octave marked with a dot below.

Also, some alternatives notations is writing the exact written numbers on the single angklung to the musical sheet, usually marked 0–31, 0 is the lowest tone and 31 is the highest tone. 

Some angklung types contains more than one notes usually marked with English chord notation, like C, Dm, Em, F, G, G7, Am, etc. This type of angklung is used for accompanying a musical piece.

Cultural context
Now,  has developed into traditional and modern musical instruments that are in demand not only by the people of Indonesia but also the world. The following are some of the functions of angklung in Indonesian culture:

Offerings for Déwi Sri
In the old Sundanese tradition, angklung is played as a form of calling to Déwi Sri, a figure described as the Goddess of Fertility, who gives blessings to rice plants so that they are fertile and prosperous for the community. This tradition is still carried out by the Baduy/Kanekes tribe, which is the remnant of the old Sundanese that still exists.

center
One of the largest angklung conservation and development centers is Saung Angklung Udjo (SAU). Founded in 1966 by Udjo Ngalagena and his wife Uum Sumiati, with the aim of preserving the traditional Sundanese arts and culture, especially angklung. SAU is located at Jalan Padasuka 118, East Bandung, West Java, Indonesia.

SAU is a complete cultural and educational tourism destination because SAU has a performance arena, a bamboo craft center, and a workshop for bamboo musical instruments. In addition, the presence of SAU in Bandung is more meaningful because of his concern to continue to preserve and develop Sundanese culture – especially Angklung – in the community through education and training facilities.

SAU holds regular performances every afternoon. This show contains spectacular performances such as a wayang golek demonstration, a helaran ceremony, traditional dance art, beginner angklung, orchestra angklung, mass angklung, and arumba. In addition to regular performances every afternoon, Saung Angklung Udjo has repeatedly held various special performances that are performed in the morning or afternoon. The show is not limited to being held at the Saung Angklung Udjo, but also at various places both at domestic and abroad. SAU is not limited to performing arts but also sells various products of traditional bamboo musical instruments such as angklung, arumba, calung, and many more.

Gamelan  

While the ensemble gets its name from the bamboo shakers, they are nowadays rarely included outside of East Bali. An ensemble of mostly bronze metallophones is used instead, generally with about 20 musicians.

An exception is the five-tone  from the north of Bali, which is what as many as seven keys. In four-tone  groups, the flute players will occasionally use an implied fifth tone. Additionally, whereas many of the instruments in  span multiple octaves of its pentatonic scale, most  instruments only contain one octave, although some five-tone ensembles have roughly an octave and a half.

 is heard in Balinese temples, where it supplies musical accompaniment to temple anniversaries. It is also characteristic of rituals related to death, and is therefore connected in Balinese culture to the invisible spiritual realm and transitions from life to death and beyond. Because of their portability,  instruments may be carried in processions while a funeral bier is carried from temporary burial in a cemetery to the cremation site. The musicians also often play music to accompany the cremation ceremony. Thus, many Balinese listeners associate  music and its  scale with strong emotions evoking a combination of sacred sweetness and sadness.

A pair of  metallophones carries the basic melody, which is elaborated by gangsa, reyong, flute, and small drums played with mallets. A medium-sized gong, called , is generally used to punctuate a piece's major sections.

Most older compositions do not employ the 's more ostentatious virtuosity and showmanship.

Outside Indonesia 
It was recorded that  was brought to Siam in 1908 by Luang Pradit Pairoh, a royal musician in the entourage of Field Marshal Prince Bhanurangsi Savangwongse of Siam, who paid a royal visit to Java that year (27 years after the first state visit of his elder brother, King Chulalongkorn, to Java in 1871). The Thai  are typically tuned in the Thai tuning system of seven equidistant steps per octave, and each  has three bamboo tubes tuned in three separate octaves rather than two, as is typical in Indonesia.

Both the Thai and Indonesian governments supported the celebration.

The  has also been adopted by its Austronesian-speaking neighbors, in particular by Malaysia and the Philippines, where they are played as part of bamboo xylophone orchestras. Formally introduced into Malaysia sometime after the end of the Confrontation,  found immediate popularity. They are generally played using a pentatonic scale similar to the Indonesian slendro, although in the Philippines, sets also come in the diatonic and minor scales used to perform various Spanish-influenced folk music in addition to native songs in pentatonic.

At least one Sundanese  ensemble exists in the United States.  is an ensemble at The Evergreen State College, and includes eighteen double rattles (nine tuned pairs) and four  drums.

World record 
On July 9, 2011, 5,182 people from many nations played  together in Washington, D.C., and are listed in the Guinness Book of Records as the largest  ensemble.

Gallery

See also 

 Music of Indonesia
 Gamelan
 Talempong

References

Further reading

External links 

 UNESCO: Indonesian Angklung
Gamelan Sekar Jaya (excerpt about angklung) from Michael Tenzer's book Balinese Music
Musical sample composed by I Nyoman Windha
Saung Angklung Udjo
Angklung Orchester Hamburg, Germany (2003/2004)
Angklung Web Institute
Lancaster Angklung Orchestra, Lancaster, UK
Angklung Hamburg
Keluarga Paduan Angklung SMA Negeri 3 Bandung

Gamelan ensembles and genres
Gamelan instruments
Idiophones
Indonesian musical instruments
Music of West Java
Indonesian culture
Sundanese culture
Intangible Cultural Heritage of Humanity
Masterpieces of the Oral and Intangible Heritage of Humanity
Indonesian words and phrases
Indonesian inventions
Asian percussion instruments